Walthamstow Queen's Road railway station is a London Overground station between  and  stations on the Gospel Oak to Barking line,  down the line from . It is in Zone 3. It opened as "Walthamstow" on 9 July 1894 and was renamed on 6 May 1968 under British Rail. The station stands on Edinburgh Road (not Queens Road) facing Walthamstow (Queens Road) Cemetery. There is step-free access from the street to both platforms.

The footpath link, which opened in August 2014, is called Ray Dudley Way in commemoration of a local man who campaigned for the link for many years.

The station is served by a train every 15 minutes in both directions throughout the day, though from June 2016 until February 2017 the service was suspended (with a rail-replacement bus in operation) whilst the line underwent major rebuilding work associated with electrification.

References

External links

Railway stations in the London Borough of Waltham Forest
DfT Category E stations
Former Tottenham and Forest Gate Railway stations
Railway stations in Great Britain opened in 1894
Railway stations served by London Overground
Walthamstow